Rule 34 is a 2022 drama film co-written and directed by Julia Murat and starring Sol Miranda. The film is named after the Internet phenomenon Rule 34. Structured as a series of short episodes, it follows a young law student who develops a passion for defending women in abuse cases. At the same time, her own sexual interests lead her into a world dominated by violence and eroticism.

A co-production between Brazil and France, the film premiered at the 75th Locarno Film Festival on 10 August 2022, where it won the Golden Leopard for Best Film. It was released theatrically in Brazil on 19 January 2023 by Imovision, and is set to be released in France on 7 June 2023 by Wayna Pitch.

Cast
 Sol Miranda as Simone
 Lucas Andrade as Coyote
 Lorena Comparato as Lucia
 Isabela Mariotto as Nat

Production

Development
Rule 34 is the third feature film by Brazilian director and screenwriter Julia Murat. The film's title refers to the so-called Rule 34, an Internet maxim which asserts that Internet pornography exists concerning every conceivable topic. The project was part of the 2019 Berlinale Co-Production Market. Murat wrote the screenplay together with Gabriela Capello, Rafael Lessa and Roberto Winter.

Filming
Filming took place in 2020. Lacking the funds to complete the film, Murat received a 35,000 grant in July 2021 as part of the Gothenburg Film Festival. Funding was provided by the festival's Audiovisual Fund, set up at the initiative of the Swedish government to protect democracy around the world.

Release
Rule 34 premiered at the 75th Locarno Film Festival on 10 August 2022, where it won the Golden Leopard for Best Film. It was also screened in the World Cinema section of the 27th Busan International Film Festival on 8 October 2022 and at the 28th Kolkata International Film Festival on 22 December 2022. The film was released theatrically in Brazil on 19 January 2023 by Imovision, and is set to be released in France on 7 June 2023 by Wayna Pitch.

Reception
Independent Swiss journalist Michael Sennhauser described Rule 34 as "a playful, cleverly argued film with a clear provocative twist" and commented that, as with the competition entry Tengo sueños eléctricos, which received three awards in Locarno, the film "clearly plays a role" that there is a female director behind the work. "Precisely because it [the film] moves in this area where personal freedom only works as long as they mutually agree that encroachment is negotiable", stated Sennhauser. Neil Young of Screen Daily dubbed it a "surprise winner". It is "a fascinating and ambitious third feature film" and "a sensual, intimate character study" by Murat. Newcomer Sol Miranda put on a "strong central performance" by a "multifaceted black woman [...] in bustling Rio de Janeiro." With her play, she penetrates the didactic tendencies of the screenplay and the theoretical treatises disguised as dialogue. Young, however, criticized the "stylistically conventional" images by cinematographer Leo Bittencourt in comparison to the red-hot topics dealt with, which are kept "pervasively flat in TV style" and would therefore hardly lose their impact on the small screen. The climax of the film is the final 75-second shot of Simone's real-life meeting with her online follower. Lead actress Miranda shows a "convincing range of emotions" and the close-up is reminiscent of Greta Garbo in Queen Christine (1933), Bob Hoskins in The Long Good Friday (1980) and Mia Farrow in The Purple Rose of Cairo (1985).

Accolades

References

External links
 

2022 films
2022 drama films
2020s French films
2020s Portuguese-language films
BDSM in films
Brazilian drama films
French drama films